The Butler House was a historic home of importance to local African American history and located at Oxon Hill, Prince George's County, Maryland, United States. Henry Alexander Butler, a free African American man from Charles County, moved with his family to the property in 1853, and the property has been continuously associated with the Butler family. Henry Butler became a Reconstruction era community leader, serving as trustee of the nearby Freedmen's Bureau school. The Butler House was a -story, one room deep wood-frame and log residence covered in cast stone. It sat in a secluded, forested area, adjacent to the Oxon Hill Children's Farm. As of December 2010, the house is in a severely dilapidated condition. In 2020 the house collapsed and the property was sold in 2019.

The Butler House is listed on the National Register of Historic Places in 2005.

References

External links
, including photo in 2004, at Maryland Historical Trust website
 M-NCPPC African-American Heritage Survey, October 1996: Other Historic Properties; Butler House, entry 76A-14 p. 130

Houses completed in 1853
Houses in Prince George's County, Maryland
Houses on the National Register of Historic Places in Maryland
African-American history of Prince George's County, Maryland
National Register of Historic Places in Prince George's County, Maryland
Oxon Hill, Maryland